Neasura pellucida is a moth of the subfamily Arctiinae. It was described by Joseph de Joannis in 1928. It is found in Vietnam.

References

 

Lithosiini
Moths described in 1928